Al Samha is a town in the emirate of Abu Dhabi in the United Arab Emirates.  The population is under 1000. The UAE owns an oil tanker named after the town. There is a hospital in Al Samha that provides medical services to the area.

References

Populated places in the Emirate of Abu Dhabi
Central Region, Abu Dhabi